Markansaya or Hatun Markansaya (Quechua) is an archaeological site in Peru. It is located in the Apurímac Region, Cotabambas Province, Haquira District.

References 

Archaeological sites in Peru
Archaeological sites in Apurímac Region